The Provincial Geographies of India was a four-volume book series which was published between 1913-23 by the Cambridge University Press under the editorship of Thomas Henry Holland.

References

External links

Cambridge University Press books
1913 books